Yazdanabad is an alternate name of Yazdan Shahr, a city in Kerman Province, Iran.

Yazdanabad may refer to various places in Iran:
 Yazdanabad, Mazandaran
 Yazdanabad, North Khorasan
 Yazdanabad-e Olya, Razavi Khorasan Province
 Yazdanabad-e Sharqi, Razavi Khorasan Province
 Yazdanabad-e Sofla, Razavi Khorasan Province
 Yazdanabad, Semnan
 Yazdanabad District, in Kerman Province
 Yazdanabad Rural District, in Kerman Province